Rabiram Narzary is a Bodoland People's Front politician from Assam. He was elected to the Assam Legislative Assembly in the 2016 election, from the Kokrajhar West constituency.

References 

Living people
Bodoland People's Front politicians
People from Kokrajhar district
Assam MLAs 2016–2021
Year of birth missing (living people)
Assam MLAs 2021–2026